Peter D. Hancock is the former president and chief executive officer (CEO) of AIG. He resigned his position of president on March 9, 2017.

Biography
Hancock was born in London, but raised in Hong Kong. He returned to the UK to attend Oxford University, where he received a B.A. in Politics, Philosophy, and Economics.

Career
Hancock has spent his entire career in financial services, including 20 years at J.P. Morgan, where he founded the Global Derivatives Group in 1991. He left J.P. Morgan in 2000 after serving as both chief financial officer and chief risk officer when the company merged with Chase Manhattan Bank. He then started a financial advisory firm named Trinsum with other J.P. Morgan alumni, before being recruited by KeyCorp during the financial crisis in 2008, where he became vice-chairman.

In 2010, at the recommendation of officials at PricewaterhouseCoopers and the Federal Reserve Bank of New York, Hancock was hired on as executive vice-president of Finance, Risk and Investments at AIG by the then-CEO, Bob Benmosche.

Hancock served as chief executive officer of AIG from September 1, 2014 to March 9, 2017. AIG paid $67.3 million to its chief executive officers in 2017, with part of the payment going to Hancock who resigned under pressure from activist investors as his turnaround plan suffered setbacks.

In March 2021, Hancock joined the board of directors of Ledger Investing.

Honors
Hancock is a member of the Board of the Japan Society, as well as a member of the International Advisory Board of British American Business. He is also a William Pitt Fellow of Pembroke College, Cambridge.

References

Living people
Year of birth missing (living people)
British chief executives
British corporate directors
American International Group people
Alumni of the University of Oxford
Chief executives in the finance industry
Chief financial officers